Mehdi Baaloudj (born 2 February 2001) is a professional footballer who plays as a forward for  club Martigues on loan from Guingamp. Born in France, he is a youth international for Algeria.

Career
Baaloudj is a product of the youth academies of Dammarie Les Lys FC, Fontainebleau, Fleury, Le Mée SF, and Sedan. He began his senior career with the reserves of Marseille, but was controversially released by the club in December 2020 after an international callup with the Algeria U20s, where questions were raised regarding COVID-19 protocols. He moved to Sainte-Geneviève for a couple of months where he couldn't play, before transferring to the reserves of Guingamp in the summer of 2021. In his debut season with Guingamp II for 2021-22 he scored 10 goals in 26 games, and was offered a professional contract with the club. On 10 June 2022, he signed the professional contract with Guingamp for 2 seasons. He made his senior debut with Guingamp in a 4–0 Ligue 2 win over Pau FC on 28 July 2022, coming on as a substitute in the 84th minute.

On 16 January 2023, Baaloudj was loaned to Martigues in Championnat National.

International career
Born in France, Baaloudj is of Algerian descent. He represented the Algeria U20s twice in a call-up in November 2020.

References

External links
 
 OM1899 Profile

2001 births
Sportspeople from Melun
French sportspeople of Algerian descent
Living people
Algerian footballers
Algeria youth international footballers
French footballers
Association football forwards
Sainte-Geneviève Sports players
En Avant Guingamp players
FC Martigues players
Ligue 2 players
Championnat National players
Championnat National 2 players